Charles Cornelius Fritz (June 13, 1882 – July 30, 1943) was an American Major League Baseball pitcher. He played for the Philadelphia Athletics during the  season.

References

Major League Baseball pitchers
Philadelphia Athletics players
Baseball players from Alabama
1882 births
1943 deaths
Greenville Grays players
Vicksburg Hill Billies players
Columbia Gamecocks players
Mobile Sea Gulls players
Shreveport Pirates (baseball) players
New Orleans Pelicans (baseball) players
Memphis Turtles players
Waco Navigators players